The Fiat Model 7002 was a 1960s Italian general-purpose helicopter with a tip jet driven rotor built by Fiat Aviazione. Only one aircraft was built.

Development
In the early 1960s, under an Italian government contract, Fiat Aviazione designed the Model 7002, a medium-capacity transport helicopter. It had an unusually-shaped fuselage made from light-alloy sheets to provide accommodation for two crew and up to five passengers. The fuselage was mounted on a skid landing gear and the fuselage had a simple tailboom with a tail rotor. A two-blade main rotor was mounted above the fuselage, with the rotor driven by compressed air propulsion nozzles at the blade-tips. The compressed air was generated by a Fiat 4700 turbo gas generator located in the rear fuselage. The prototype helicopter first flew on 26 January 1961 but no production aircraft were built.

Specifications

.

See also

References

 The Illustrated Encyclopedia of Aircraft (Part Work 1982-1985), 1985, Orbis Publishing

7002
1960s Italian civil utility aircraft
1960s Italian helicopters
Single-turbine helicopters
Aircraft first flown in 1961
Tipjet-powered helicopters